Gorganduz (also romanized as Gorgāndūz; also known as Gagāndūz) is a village in Zavkuh Rural District, Pishkamar District, Kalaleh County, Golestan Province, Iran. According to the 2006 census, its population consisted of 225 individuals among 51 families.

References 

Populated places in Kalaleh County